Robert Wayne Duncan (20 December 1920 – 12 October 2013) was an American flying ace in the Pacific theatre of World War II. Duncan was the first person to shoot down a Mitsubishi A6M Zero while flying a Grumman F6F Hellcat. He was in the U.S. Navy from 1942 to 1966, retiring with the rank of Captain after having flown more than 100 combat missions in World War II and the Korean War.

World War II 
After a Mitsubishi Zero crashed in the Aleutian Islands, the U.S. Navy reconstructed the plane in order to study and test it to find its weaknesses in aerial combat. This led to the development of the Hellcat which was an improvement over the Grumman F4F Wildcat.

Duncan, then an Ensign, scored his first and second aerial victories in the Hellcat, the second being Japanese flying ace Warrant Officer Toshiyuki Sueda, who previously had downed nine American aircraft, mostly Grumman Wildcats. Sueda had previously lured Wildcats into a trap by flying into a vertical loop and waiting for them to stall out before diving down to shoot them. However, this same technique failed to cause the similar looking but improved Hellcat to stall and Duncan was able to shoot his opponent down. Duncan was unaware for a while that his second kill was a flying ace, and not a rookie pilot because the dogfight did not prove to be particularly difficult.

He became the most successful pilot in his squadron, totaling seven victories, all Mitsubishi Zeros. His aviation accomplishments in 1944, when he became the first flying ace in his squadron after he scored his fifth victory in Operation Hailstone, were documented on the History Channel.

Subsequent Navy service 
He retired from the Navy in 1966 with the rank of captain, his final post being commander of the 8th Navy Recruiting Area at San Francisco. Duncan was awarded the Navy Cross in 2003, decades after Admiral Chester W. Nimitz had recommended him for the award.

Post-Navy 
Following his retirement from the Navy, Duncan was the chairman of the board of the Williamson County Regional Airport Authority.

He died in his birthplace of Marion, Illinois at age 92 and is buried at the Barham Cemetery.

References

1920 births
2013 deaths
American World War II flying aces
People from Marion, Illinois
Recipients of the Air Medal
Recipients of the Distinguished Flying Cross (United States)
Recipients of the Navy Cross (United States)
United States Navy captains
Military personnel from Illinois
United States Navy personnel of the Korean War
United States Naval Aviators
Burials in Illinois
Aviators from Illinois